Fyfield and West Overton is a joint parish council for the parishes of Fyfield and West Overton, in the English county of Wiltshire.

It falls within the area of the Wiltshire Council unitary authority, which is responsible for all significant local government functions.

References

External links
 Fyfield and West Overton Parish Council

Local government in Wiltshire